The Waynesboro Downtown Historic District  is a national historic district in Waynesboro, Virginia. In 2002, it included 43 contributing buildings in the compact central business district of Waynesboro.  The district includes churches, houses, mixed-use commercial buildings, banks, specialty stores, offices, a hotel, restaurants, and parking lots.  Notable buildings include the First National Bank (1908–09), the LB&B Building (1929), and the General Wayne Hotel (1937-1938).

It was listed on the National Register of Historic Places in 2002.

See also
Port Republic Road Historic District
Tree Streets Historic District (Waynesboro, Virginia)

References

Historic districts on the National Register of Historic Places in Virginia
Federal architecture in Virginia
Italianate architecture in Virginia
Buildings and structures in Waynesboro, Virginia
National Register of Historic Places in Waynesboro, Virginia